High Hunsley is a small hamlet in the East Riding of Yorkshire, England.

High Hunsley forms part of the civil parish of Rowley. It is situated on the  B1230 road and the Yorkshire Wolds Way passes close to the west.

In 1823 Hunsley (then both High and Low), was in the civil parish of Rowley and the Wapentake of Harthill. Occupations at the time included two farmers, a corn factor (trader), a yeoman, and a gentlewoman.

Deserted medieval village 
In 1823 Baines' History, Directory and Gazetteer of the County of York stated that Hunsley was formerly "a place of some consequence," where "the foundations of ancient buildings are sometimes dug up".

In 2022 one of the house platforms in the deserted medieval village was partially excavated by the local community assisted by archaeologists from Ethos Heritage CIC.  The excavations were attended by over 150 local participants including local special needs schools, the Girl Guides, Brownies, Children in Care and Special Needs Schools.

They found some well preserved remains, including a suspected alehouse or inn. In addition a large amount of Medivial Pottery and Metal Artefacts were uncovered including air pins, coins and dress fastenings.

Transmitter site 
To the west of the settlement is the  High Hunsley transmitter, which is used by local radio stations BBC Radio Humberside, Viking FM and Capital Yorkshire.

Analogue radio

Digital radio

References

External links

 High Hunsley transmitter.
 More High Hunsley mast from Richard Moore

Hamlets in the East Riding of Yorkshire
Transmitter sites in England
Deserted medieval villages in the East Riding of Yorkshire